The Rocky River is a perennial river of the Snowy River catchment, located in the East Gippsland region of the Australian state of Victoria.

Course and features
The Rocky River rises below Mount Murrungowar in a state forestry area west of the locality of Murrungowar, and flows generally southwest before reaching its confluence with the Jack River, within the Brodribb Flora Reserve in the Shire of East Gippsland. The river descends  over its  course.

The catchment area of the river is administered by the East Gippsland Catchment Management Authority.

See also

 List of rivers of Australia

References

External links
 
 
 

East Gippsland catchment
Rivers of Gippsland (region)